USS Whitehall was a steamer acquired by the Union Navy during the American Civil War. She was assigned blockade duty; however, her condition was not always considered seaworthy, and she was plagued with condition problems.

Whitehall—a side-wheel gunboat and converted ferry built in 1850 at Brooklyn, New York—was purchased by the Navy there on 10 October 1861 and was commissioned soon thereafter at the New York Navy Yard, Acting Master Francis P. Allen in command.

Assigned to the South Atlantic Blockade

Assigned to the South Atlantic Blockading Squadron, Whitehall sailed for Port Royal, South Carolina; but her unseaworthy condition prevented her completing the voyage south. She put into Philadelphia, Pennsylvania, in early November for emergency repairs and stopped again at Hampton Roads for the same purpose a few days later. Whitehall left Newport News, Virginia, for Port Royal on 5 November—only to be forced back to Hampton Roads by high seas on 6 November. On 7 November, carpenters examining Whitehall declared her unseaworthy. Again Whitehall turned back, reentering Hampton Roads on 13 November 1861. That same day, she was ordered to Baltimore, Maryland, for an extensive overhaul.

Reassigned to the North Atlantic Blockade

Whitehall was reassigned to the North Atlantic Blockading Squadron in Hampton Roads on 29 November 1861. She departed the Virginia Capes on 6 December 1861, bound for Annapolis, Maryland, to pick up arms and provisions for the squadron and returned to Hampton Roads, On 29 December 1861, Whitehall and eight other steamers engaged CSS Sea Bird in the roads shortly after the Confederate steamer had captured a water schooner and attacked the Army steamer, Express, which had been towing it. After an action lasting one-half hour, Sea Bird withdrew from the battle and retired under the protection of Confederate shore batteries. Whitehall and  covered Union forces as they withdrew.

"The worst boat of all ferryboats..."

On 2 January 1862, Whitehall got underway for Hatteras Inlet, North Carolina. However, she immediately became disabled and returned to Hampton Roads. Flag Officer Louis M. Goldsborough, commanding the North Atlantic Blockading Squadron, called Whitehall "the worst sea boat of all the ferryboats with which I have had to do, and certainly the most unfortunate." A survey taken of the vessel on 22 February 1862 found both her machinery and hull badly deteriorated.

Action against the CSS Virginia

Whitehall saw her final action on 8 and 9 March 1862 against the Confederate ironclad CSS Virginia, the former Merrimack. On 8 March, federal gunboats, including Whitehall, attempted to draw the Rebel vessel away from Union warships anchored off Newport News, Virginia. Failing this, Whitehall engaged Confederate steamers Yorktown and CSS Jamestown, inflicting minor damage. During the Battle of the Monitor and Merrimack on 9 March 1862, Whitehall and the rest of the Union fleet abstained from direct battle, preferring to fire long-range, ineffective shots at Virginia. Whitehall suffered three casualties and had parts of her upperworks burned by Confederate shot during the two days of activity.

Whitehall destroyed by fire

Early on the morning of 10 March 1862 at Old Point Comfort, Virginia, a flash fire swept and totally destroyed Whitehall. There were no casualties.

References 

Ships of the Union Navy
Ships built in Brooklyn
Steamships of the United States Navy
Gunboats of the United States Navy
American Civil War patrol vessels of the United States
1850 ships
Shipwrecks of the American Civil War
Shipwrecks of the Virginia coast
Ship fires
Maritime incidents in March 1862